Tripartite motif-containing protein 3 is a protein that in humans is encoded by the TRIM3 gene.

The protein encoded by this gene is a member of the tripartite motif (TRIM) family, also called the 'RING-B-box-coiled-coil' (RBCC) subgroup of RING finger proteins. The TRIM motif includes three zinc-binding domains, a RING, a B-box type 1 and a B-box type 2, and a coiled-coil region. This protein localizes to cytoplasmic filaments. It is similar to a rat protein which is a specific partner for the tail domain of myosin V, a class of myosins which are involved in the targeted transport of organelles. The rat protein can also interact with alpha-actinin-4. Thus it is suggested that this human protein may play a role in myosin V-mediated cargo transport. Alternatively spliced transcript variants encoding the same isoform have been identified.

Interactions 

TRIM3 has been shown to interact with Actinin alpha 4.

TRIM3 binds to and ubiquitinates Estrogen receptor alpha (ERa) leading to receptor's stabilization. 

Moreover, TRIM3 interacts with P53 which promotes the formation of K48-linked poly-ubiquitin chains and degradation.

References

Further reading